Royal Air Force Full Sutton or RAF Full Sutton is a former Royal Air Force station located  south east of Stamford Bridge, East Riding of Yorkshire and  north west of Pocklington, East Riding of Yorkshire, England. The base did not open until May 1944, and so was the last airfield built for Bomber Command.

History

The airfield opened in 1944 under No. 4 Group, as part of RAF Bomber Command, with No. 77 Squadron RAF arriving at RAF Full Sutton on 15 May 1944 with the Handley Page Halifax Mks III and VI. The base was the last operational airfield constructed for Bomber Command in the Second World War. The base was laid out in the standard design of a heavy bomber station, having three runways in an 'A' shape. The runways, which crossed in an almost perfect triangular pattern, were laid down with different lengths to a standard heavy bomber base design. The non-standard runway distance has been put down to the land boundaries of the base. To the south-wst side of the airfield, was a railway line connecting York to Beverley.

No. 77 Sqn switched to the Douglas Dakota aircraft in July 1945, then the squadron moved to RAF Broadwell on at the end of August 1945. RAF Full Sutton was switched to RAF Transport Command being used by a flight of No. 231 Squadron RAF between 1 December 1945 and 15 January 1946 operating the Avro Lancastrian C.2 before being disbanded.

In the 1950s it was part of RAF Flying Training Command, as No. 103 Flying Refresher School RAF and then as No. 207 Advanced Flying School RAF. Both of these schools held training on Meteor aircraft as a response to the Korean War. One of the aircraft, WF831, crashed onto the railway line in 1952 just as a goods train was passing.

The airfield was then placed on care and maintenance until 1959 when No. 102 Squadron RAF arrived and the airfield was re-modelled as a PGM-17 Thor missile site, operating until 27 April 1963.

The area is now used as the civilian Full Sutton Airfield, being home to the Full Sutton Flying Centre, and another part of the site houses HMP Full Sutton, which opened in April 1988.

References

Citations

Bibliography

External links
 Airfield Information Exchange

Royal Air Force stations in Yorkshire
Buildings and structures in the East Riding of Yorkshire
Royal Air Force stations of World War II in the United Kingdom